Michael or Mick Howell may refer to:

Michael Howell (rugby league) (born 1982), Australian rugby league player
Mick Howell (Australian football) (1946–1985), Australian football player
Mick Howell (referee), Australian rugby league referee
Mike Howell, American football player

See also
Michael Howells (1957–2018), English designer